Collaboration West is an album by jazz vibraphonist and pianist Teddy Charles recorded in 1953 for the Prestige label. Four tracks from an earlier session were added to the 1993 CD release.

Reception

The Allmusic review by Scott Yanow states: "Although there are some swinging sections, much of the music is quite complex with difficult arrangements and some polytonality... The music is thought-provoking if a bit cold and clinical, easier to respect than to love".

Track listing
All compositions by Teddy Charles except where noted.
 "Variations on a Motive by Bud"  – 4:20   
 "Wailing Dervish" (Shorty Rogers) – 4:31   
 "Further Out" – 5:42   
 "Etudiez le Cahier" – 3:48   
 "Margo" – 4:51   
 "Bobalob" – 7:01   
 "Edging Out" – 4:13 Bonus track on CD reissue   
 "Nocturne" – 2:52 Bonus track on CD reissue    
 "Composition for Four Pieces" (Jimmy Raney) – 1:35 Bonus track on CD reissue    
 "A Night in Tunisia" (Dizzy Gillespie, Frank Paparelli) – 6:44 Bonus track on CD reissue

Note  
Recorded in New York City on December 23, 1952 (tracks 7-10) and in Los Angeles, California on August 21, 1953 (tracks 1-4) and August 31, 1953 (tracks 5 & 6)

Personnel 
Teddy Charles – vibraphone, piano
Shorty Rogers – trumpet (tracks 1-6)
Jimmy Raney – guitar (tracks 7-10) 
Curtis Counce (tracks 1-6), Dick Nivison (tracks 7-10) – bass
Shelly Manne (tracks 1-6),  Ed Shaughnessy (tracks 7-10) – drums
Jimmy Giuffre – clarinet, tenor saxophone, baritone saxophone (tracks 5 & 6)

References 

1956 albums
Prestige Records albums
Teddy Charles albums
Albums produced by Bob Weinstock
Albums produced by Ira Gitler